The Diocese of Mercedes is a Latin Church ecclesiastical territory or diocese of the Catholic church in Uruguay.

History
The diocese was erected in 1960, from parts of both the Diocese of Salto and the Diocese of San José de Mayo. The diocese is a suffragan of the Archdiocese of Montevideo. Its see is at the Cathedral of Mercedes.

The current bishop is Carlos María Collazzi Irazábal, who was appointed in 1995.

Bishops

Ordinaries
Enrico Lorenzo Cabrera Urdangarin † (31 Dec 1960 Appointed – 23 May 1974 Died) 
Andrés María Rubio Garcia, S.D.B. † (22 May 1975 Appointed – 14 Feb 1995 Resigned) 
Carlos María Collazzi Irazábal, S.D.B. (14 Feb 1995 Appointed – )

Auxiliary bishop
José Gottardi Cristelli, S.D.B. † (1972–1975), appointed Auxiliary Bishop of Montevideo

Other priest of this diocese who became bishop
Pedro Ignacio Wolcan Olano, appointed Bishop of Tacuarembó in 2018

See also
List of churches in the Diocese of Mercedes
List of Roman Catholic dioceses in Uruguay

References

External links
 
 Diocese of Mercedes - CEU 

Religion in Soriano Department
Religion in Colonia Department
Mercedes
Mercedes
Christian organizations established in 1960
1960 establishments in Uruguay
Mercedes